(born June 26, 1986) is a Japanese professional wrestler trained by and signed Dragon Gate better known by his ring name Kzy (ケーズィー Kēzī  ).

Trained in the Dragon Gate dojo, Kzy initially debuted in 2006 as m.c.KZ, with the gimmick of a rapper who rapped his own theme song and wore ring attire heavily influenced by American hip-hop culture. In 2009, he changed his ring name to simply Kzy, the name he uses to this day. He is a one time Open the Brave Gate Champion and six time Open the Triangle Gate Champion, as well as the King of Gate 2021 winner.

Career

Dragon Gate (2006–present)
During 2006, he debuted during some Dragon Gate NEX shows as m.c.KZ. His gimmick was that of a rapper, and he rapped his own theme song on his way to the ring. In 2007, he and Lupin Matsutani, another wrestler on the Dragon Gate NEX circuit, teamed together as Lupin the KZ. When BxB Hulk and YAMATO became injured before the inaugural Summer Adventure Tag League Tournament, Lupin the KZ were chosen to replace the New Hazard team. Later in the year, he managed to pull out a win against CIMA on a NEX show. CIMA had previously injured his neck and was advised not to wrestle, but did it anyway as a way to put over the young wrestler.

At the start of 2008, he won the NEX-1 tournament, and after completing a five match trial series, he departed for Mexico to hone his skills. In June, he received a phone call from Naruki Doi inviting him to join his WORLD-1 faction, and he accepted. Despite getting a push when he first returned, culminating in a chance at winning the vacant Open the Brave Gate Championship, he soon fell into a horrific slump, getting pinned or tapping out during tag team or six-man tag matches that he was involved in. He also appeared once for Chikara in the U.S. during their King of Trios tournament that year, beating Michael Nakazawa in a singles match on the third night of the event.

He slightly improved in 2009, but still remained the lowest ranking member of WORLD-1. On June 26, he officially quit WORLD-1 and joined up with heel stable Real Hazard, after helping Ryo Saito and Genki Horiguchi retain their Open the Twin Gate Titles against CIMA and Gamma under the Dr. Muscle disguise and unmasking after the match. The next night, he changed his name to Kzy (pronounced "kay-zee") and debuted a completely new look.

On January 10, 2010, when stablemate Genki Horiguchi announced that Real Hazard would be winning more matches through teamwork rather than illegal methods and Yasushi Kanda was against this idea, Kzy - along with Takuya Sugawara - sided with Kanda in the matter. The issue eventually caused a divide in Real Hazard, with them on one side and Horiguchi, Susumu Yokosuka & K-ness on the other. In the midst of this, KAGETORA - who had rejoined Real Hazard a very short time ago - began to resent rejoining their ranks. A match was set for February 11 between Kzy and KAGETORA, where the loser would be kicked out of Real Hazard, and Kzy emerged victorious. The day before, Horiguchi, Yokosuka & K-ness left Real Hazard, and a couple of weeks later, he and the others in the stable retired the Real Hazard name and began calling their unit Deep Drunkers. On October 13, 2010, the Deep Drunkers were forced to split up, after losing a match against WORLD-1 (BxB Hulk, Masato Yoshino and Naruki Doi), but after the match Doi turned on WORLD-1 to form a new stable with Kzy, Kanda Naoki Tanizaki and Takuya Sugawara. In December 2010 Kzy was sidelined with a leg injury. Meanwhile, his new stable merged themselves with CIMA's Warriors stable, forming a new top heel faction. On January 18 the new group was named Blood Warriors. Kzy made his return on May 27, 2011, when he was revealed as the newest member of Blood Warriors and the replacement for Gamma, who had just been kicked out of the group. On September 2, Kzy, Naoki Tanizaki and Naruki Doi defeated Gamma, Masato Yoshino and YAMATO to win the Dragon Gate Open the Triangle Gate Championship. They were stripped of the title on January 19, 2012, after Tanizaki was sidelined for six months with a shoulder injury. On March 1, the new leader of Blood Warriors, Akira Tozawa, changed the stable's name to Mad Blankey. On March 25, 2012, Kzy unsuccessfully challenged Ricochet for the Open the Brave Gate Championship.  On December 9, Kzy, impostor Naoki Tanizaki and BxB Hulk unsuccessfully challenged Genki Horiguchi H.A.Gee.Mee!!, Ryo "Jimmy" Saito and Mr. Quu Quu Toyonaka Dolphin for the Dragon Gate Open the Triangle gate championship.  On April 12, 2013, Kzy unsuccessfully challenged Dragon Kid for the Open the Brave Gate championship.  On May 5, Kzy, Mondai Ryu and Uhaa Nation unsuccessfully challenged for the Open the Triangle Gate Championship in a 3-way 6 man tag match with Kzy getting his team eliminated by getting pinned by Dragon Kid.  On September 29, Kzy challenged for the vacant Open the Brave Gate championship in a losing effort to Genki Horiguchi H.A.Gee.Mee!!. On February 20, 2014, Kzy, Naruki Doi and Cyber Kong challenged for the vacant Open the Triangle Gate championship in a losing effort to Jimmy Susumu, Yasushi Kanda and Mr. Kyu Kyu Tanizaki Naoki Toyonaka Dolphin. On May 5, at Dragon Gate's Dead or Alive event Kzy was represented by Naruki Doi in a Lucha de Apuesta style cage match where if you don't get a flag the person your representing for gets their head shaved, Doi didn't capture a flag so Kzy had to get his head shaved. On June 6, Kzy, Naruki Doi and Cyber Kong won the Open the Triangle gate championship in a 3-way 6-Man Tag match with Kzy pinning U-T after hitting his finisher Impact. On September 9 Kzy unsuccessfully challenged Flamita for the Open the Brave Gate championship. Kzy, Naruki Doi and Cyber Kong defended the triangle belts 3 times before losing the belts on October 9, to CIMA, Gamma and Don Fujii after Gamma hit Kzy with the Skytwister press. After losing the Triangle Belt Kzy was sidelined with an eye injury.

On January 12, 2015, Kzy, as the masked Dr. Muscle, defeated Eita in the finals of a tournament to win the vacant Open the Brave Gate Championship. He unmasked four days later, betraying Mad Blankey and jumping to Dia.Hearts. On February 28, Kzy lost the Open the Brave Gate Championship to Akira Tozawa. On February 4, 2016, Dia.HEARTS was forced to disband after he took the final fall in an elimination match which also included Monster Express and VerserK. On May 28, Kzy, along with BxB Hulk, YAMATO, and Yosuke♥Santa Maria, formed a new unit named Tribe Vanguard.

Championships and accomplishments
Dragon Gate
Open the Brave Gate Championship (1 time)
Open the Twin Gate Championship (1 time, current) - with Big Boss Shimizu (1, current)
Open the Triangle Gate Championship (7 times) – with Takuya Sugawara and Yasushi Kanda (1), Naoki Tanizaki and Naruki Doi (1), Cyber Kong and Naruki Doi (1), BxB Hulk and YAMATO (1), Genki Horiguchi and Susumu Yokosuka (2) and U-T and Jacky "Funky" Kamei (1)
NEX-1 Tournament (2008)
King of Gate (2021)
Pro Wrestling Illustrated
 Ranked No. 130 of the top 500 singles wrestlers in the PWI 500 in 2021

Luchas de Apuestas record

Notes

References

External links
m.c.KZ profile on Dragon Gate USA
blog

Japanese male professional wrestlers
1986 births
Living people
People from Ebetsu, Hokkaido
21st-century professional wrestlers
Open the Brave Gate Champions
Open the Triangle Gate Champions